is the 4th album of Zard and was released on July 10, 1993 under B-Gram Records.

Background
The album include her biggest hits such as Makenaide and Yureru Omoi.

Chart performance
The album reached #1 rank first week with 571,020 copies. It charted for 56 weeks and sold more than 2,230,900 copies. In 1993, it was the highest sold album and reached #1 rank (as album) for whole year.

Track listing
All lyrics written by Izumi Sakai.

Usage in media
In My Arms Tonight: theme song for Tokyo Broadcasting System Television drama "Gakkou ga Abunai"
Makenaide: ending theme for Fuji TV drama "Shiratori Reiko de Gozaimasu!"
Kimi ga Inai: theme song for Nihon TV drama "Kanojo no Kiraina Kanojo"
Yureru Omoi: commercial song of Pocari Sweat
Anata wo Suki dakedo: commercial song of "Mitsubishi Oil Co"

References 

Zard albums
1993 albums
Being Inc. albums
Japanese-language albums
Albums produced by Daiko Nagato

Chart positions
{| class="wikitable"
!Year
!Album
!Chart
!Position
!Weeks
!Annual Sales
!Total Sales
!Yearly Position
|-
|1993
|Yureru OmoiE
|Japanese Oricon Weekly Albums Chart (Top 100)
|1
|56
|1,938,120
|rowspan=2|2,239,354
|1